CMP-N,N'-diacetyllegionaminic acid synthase (CMP-N,N'-diacetyllegionaminic acid synthetase, neuA (gene), legF (gene)) is an enzyme with systematic name CTP:N,N'-diacetyllegionaminate cytidylyltransferase. This enzyme catalyses the following chemical reaction

 CTP + N,N'-diacetyllegionaminate  CMP-N,N'-diacetyllegionaminate + diphosphate

This enzyme is isolated from the bacteria Legionella pneumophila and Campylobacter jejuni.

References

External links 
 

EC 2.7.7